West Kirby Grammar School (abbreviated to WKGS) is a non-denominational selective state grammar school, founded in 1913, with academy status in West Kirby on the Wirral Peninsula, England. The school admits girls from age 11 to 18 and, since 1985, boys for the sixth form only.

The school is one of The Sunday Times top one hundred state schools.

History

In 1912 it was open for girls and boys but in 1913 was made an all girls grammar school. Founded in 1913 the school celebrated its 95th anniversary in 2008, with a whole school photograph. The school celebrated its 100th birthday in 2013, a weekend of events including another whole school photograph and a concert at Liverpool Philharmonic Hall. The 'Centenary Room', funded by the Old Girls' Association, was also opened next to the main hall of the school. In May 2011 the school was given a grant to renovate facilities on site, this was used to build two new teaching blocks, with work due to be completed in 2009. The technology block was completed in September 2007, and the English/Humanities block in October 2008.

The school has several international links, successfully running a variety of trips to Fougeres, France; the Christmas Markets in Cologne and Aachen, Germany; Barcelona, Spain; an exchange programme with a school in Gladenbach, Germany; Yaroslavl, Russia. Additionally the school often raises funds for its "Make a Difference" campaign, raising money for Inner Mongolian schools, before having a trip for selected students in the summer holidays to Hong Kong, mainland China and to Inner Mongolia to see how the money is being put to use. Furthermore, in 2006 the school won the Wirral International School Award.

The school has 6 houses; Hudson (White), Stewart (Yellow), Gonner (Blue), Furniss (Purple), Wallis (Red) and Paton (Green). These all compete throughout the year at various house events ranging from music and a general knowledge quiz to team and individual sports.

Two pupils from the school have taken part in the international schools Arctic expedition and the international young scientists space camp; both these pupils who attended sixth form at the school were representing the UK. The school's Under 13 football team has also achieved national success after competing in the final of the tournament at Wembley stadium.

Curriculum
Pupils at the school study a standard UK curriculum with GCSE and A-Level examinations taken at ages 16 and 18.

Sports studied as standard in Physical Education lessons include Hockey, Netball, Tennis, Gymnastics and Athletics.

Students from West Kirby Grammar School had the chance to quiz a senior Government minister when they held their own question time session.

Links with other schools
There is a large Combined Cadet Force contingent shared with Calday Grange Grammar School, which students from Year 9 upwards can join. There is a German exchange programme and there are also links with schools in Germany, Finland, Hungary and Poland through the European Union's Comenius programme.

Notable former pupils

 Jill Crawshaw, travel writer
 Sally Grindley, children's author; her 2004 book Spilled Water won the Nestlé Smarties Book Prize
 Tracy de Groose (née Darwen), chief executive from 2018-20 of Newsworks (the newspaper industry advertising body), from 2014-18 of Dentsu Aegis Network and its predecessor Carat UK from 2010–14, Brand Director from 1996-98 of Stella Artois (owned by Whitbread) (1979–86)
 Shirley Hughes, children's author
 Glenda Jackson, actress and former Labour MP from 1992-2015 for Hampstead and Highgate; she left school with no discernible qualifications to work in the local Boots, where the shop manager spotted her talent, and largely arranged a scholarship from Cheshire County Council for her to attend RADA
 Julia Kneale, former girlfriend of Andy McCluskey, who formed The Id
 Jan Ravens, from Dead Ringers, noted for her impersonations of Ruth Archer (ohh nohhh) from The Archers, and Kirsty Wark from Newsnight
 Ruth McCartney, step-sister of Paul McCartney (her 34-year-old mother married his 62-year-old father in November 1964, when she was four)
 Sheila McClennon,  Radio 4 presenter on Woman's Hour and You and Yours

Former teachers
 Sophia Churney, former Psychology teacher, was part of Ooberman; her brother was musician Russell Churney
 Leonard Milne, former head of Music; he trained at the Northern School of Music, was organist of All Saints Church, Speke, and (briefly) gave Paul McCartney weekly piano lessons in 1958 at his home at 237 Mather Avenue in Allerton

External links
 West Kirby Grammar School website

Girls' schools in Merseyside
Grammar schools in the Metropolitan Borough of Wirral
Educational institutions established in 1913
1913 establishments in England
Academies in the Metropolitan Borough of Wirral